Heaven Sword and Dragon Sabre, also known as Chivalrous Killer, is a two-part 1978 Hong Kong film adapted from Louis Cha's novel The Heaven Sword and Dragon Saber.

Cast
 Derek Yee as Zhang Wuji
 Ching Li as Zhao Min
 Candice Yu as Zhou Zhiruo
 Cheng Lai-fong as Xiaozhao
 Wen Hsueh-erh as Yin Li / Zhu'er
 Wong Yung as Yang Xiao
 Ngai Fei as Yin Liting
 Lau Wai-ling as Ji Xiaofu
 Karen Chan as Yang Buhui
 Lo Lieh as Xie Xun
 Tin Ching as Cheng Kun / Yuanzhen
 Cheung Ying as Zhang Sanfeng
 Wang Lai as Miejue
 Teresa Ha as Daiqisi
 Ching Miao as Yin Tianzheng
 Norman Chui as Wei Yixiao
 Wai Wang as Fan Yao
 Ku Kuan-chung as Song Qingshu
 Tang Tak-cheung as Mo Shenggu
 Yeung Chi-hing as Shuobude
 Chiang Nan as Peng Yingyu
 Keung Hon as Iron-crowned Taoist
 Chan Shen as He Taichong
 Hung Ling-ling as Ban Shuxian
 Hon Kwok-choi as Kongjian
 Woo Wang-dat as Kongwen
 Ng Man-tat as Hu Qingniu
 Cheung Wai-yee as Wang Nangu
 Lee Sau-kei as Zhu Changling
 Helen Poon as Zhu Jiuzhen
 Chung Kwok-yan as Shi Huolong
 Yue Wing as Ruyang Prince
 Ka Wa as Cloud messenger
 Austin Wai as Wind messenger
 Kara Hui as Moon messenger

External links
 
 
 
 

1978 films
Films based on works by Jin Yong
Hong Kong martial arts films
Works based on The Heaven Sword and Dragon Saber
Wuxia films
Films set in the Yuan dynasty
Shaw Brothers Studio films
Films about rebels
Films directed by Chor Yuen
1970s Hong Kong films